Laghi del Gorzente is a group of three lakes in north-west Italy which straddles the provinces of Genoa (in Liguria) and Alessandria (in Piedmont).

Geography 
The lowest lake is named Lago Bruno (647 m), while Lago Lungo is at 684 m and Lago Badana at 717 m.

Nature conservation 
The lakes are included in the Piedmontese natural park of the Capanne di Marcarolo.

References 

Reservoirs in Italy
Lakes of Liguria
Lakes of Piedmont
Metropolitan City of Genoa
Province of Alessandria